The European Business Register Network (EBR Network) is a network of trade registers kept by the registration authorities of several European countries, managed by the European Business Registry Association. The EBR was developed as a part of the fully integrated approach of the European Commission in the legislation designed to achieve regulations to promote transparent financial markets and to facilitate free movement of companies. The EBR has served as a starting point of the Business Register Interoperability Throughout Europe (BRITE) project which developed an interoperability solution BRIS for Business Registers to interact across the European Union. BRIS makes it possible to obtain comparable, official company information from the countries connected to the network.

The EBR is at the moment composed of 26 partners and delivers company information from 25 European countries.

Amongst others the European Business registers contains remarks about:
legal name of a company
Registered office
people representing the company (Managing Director, Board of Directors, holders of Proxy) 
subscribed capital if any.
Many scams circulate offering inclusion in the European Business register against payment of a hidden fee, these do not refer to the official register though; inclusion in the European Business Register is free of charge and mostly automatically done by registering a company within one of the partnering countries.

See also 
 List of company registers
 OpenCorporates

References

 COMMUNICATION FROM THE COMMISSION on a simplified business environment for companies in the areas of company law, accounting and auditing, Brussels, 2007-07-10 (PDF, 192 KB)

External links 
 Official website of the European Business Register Network

Online databases 
Databases in Europe
Registrars of companies